Clement Eyer Smoot (April 7, 1884 – January 19, 1963) was an American golfer who competed in the 1904 Summer Olympics. He was born in Illinois and died in Los Angeles, California. In 1904 he was part of the American team which won the gold medal. He finished 6th in this competition. In the individual competition he finished 22nd in the qualification and was eliminated in the first round of the match play.

References

External links
Sports Reference
 Profile

American male golfers
Amateur golfers
Golfers at the 1904 Summer Olympics
Olympic gold medalists for the United States in golf
Medalists at the 1904 Summer Olympics
Golfers from Illinois
People from Highland Park, Illinois
1884 births
1963 deaths